Devon is a county in England.

Devon also may refer to:

Places

Australia
 Devon Meadows, Victoria, a town
 Devon railway station, a former railway station in Victoria

Canada
 Devon, Alberta, a town
 Devon, Nova Scotia, a rural community in the Halifax Regional Municipality, Nova Scotia
 Devon Island, the second-largest of the Queen Elizabeth Islands, Nunavut
 Devon, New Brunswick, a town until 1973, then amalgamated into Fredericton

South Africa
 Devon, Gauteng, a small mining town

United Kingdom
 Devon (European Parliament constituency)
 Devon (UK Parliament constituency)
 River Devon, Clackmannanshire, a river in Glen Devon, Scotland
 River Devon, Nottinghamshire, a river in England

United States
 Devon (Milford), a village in Milford, Connecticut
 Devon, Kansas, an unincorporated community
 Devon, Pennsylvania, a census-designated place
 Devon station (Pennsylvania)
 Devon, West Virginia, an unincorporated community
 Devon Avenue (Chicago), a major street in Chicago, Illinois

People 
 Devon (given name)
 Devon (surname)

Fiction 
 The Devon School, a fictional school in John Knowles' novels A Separate Peace and Peace Breaks Out.
 Devon (The Office), a character in The Office
 Devon Hamilton, a fictional character in The Young and the Restless.

Other uses
 Devon cattle, sometimes called North Devon cattle to distinguish it from South Devon cattle. "Devon cattle" is the same breed as "North Devon cattle".
 Devonian, a geologic period
 Devon (sausage)
 de Havilland Devon, aircraft
 Devon Energy, an energy company
 Devon Tower, corporate HQ
 Earl of Devon, a title

See also
 Devan (disambiguation)
 Devonian (disambiguation)